Khwahan/() is a town (and a fort) and the capital of Khwahan District, in Badakhshan Province in north-eastern Afghanistan. It is located on the left bank of the Panj River, subregions of Darwaz.

.

History
After Alexander the Great overthrew the Persians, the area came under the rule of  the Greco-Bactrian king Euthydemus I and his son Demetrius I

The village has a fort called Qala Khwahan. The fort is made of mud, in the shape of a square with three bastions on each face, with a capacity of 500 to 600 individuals. It is similar to most other forts in the area. For about two miles in each direction is cultivated land.

The village contained roughly 160 houses around the turn of the 20th century.

The inhabitants of this area speak Dari Persian and are Sunni Muslims; and engage in agriculture. They grow Buckwheat, red and white barley, sesame, zucchini, corn, mung beans, peas, beans, potatoes.

Geography

The area is mountainous, with Kuh-e Kallat a prominent mountain in the district.  This peak is 4090 meters high above sea level. The town sits on the Panj River and is one of very few Afghan towns with Tajikistan to its south.  Road access is to Kulob, Tadjikistan.

Climate

References

External links
Satellite map at Maplandia.com

Populated places in Khwahan District